Rashmi Ranjan Parida (born 7 July 1977) is an Indian cricketer, who plays for Vidarbha in Indian Domestic Cricket.He has played for Odisha, Rajasthan and Assam. He is primarily a right-handed batsman. He made his debut for Odisha in 1994 and played for them till 2008. He then turned professional and played for Assam a year. He then played for Rajasthan and played a crucial role in their promotion from plate group and in winning 2010–11 Ranji Trophy. In 2013–14 Ranji Trophy he decided to play for Vidarbha.

References

External links

1977 births
Vidarbha cricketers
Odisha cricketers
Rajasthan cricketers
Assam cricketers
East Zone cricketers
Himachal Pradesh cricketers
Indian cricketers
Living people
Indian cricket coaches
Sportspeople from Bhubaneswar
Cricketers from Odisha